Count Gustaf Otto Stenbock (7 September 1614 – 24 September 1685) was a Swedish soldier and politician. 

He was son of Friherre Gustav Eriksson Stenbock (1575–1629) and Countess Beata Margareta Brahe (1583–1645),  born in Torpa, Länghem parish, Tranemo Municipality, Västergötland, Sweden. 

He was appointed commanding officer of the Kronoberg Regiment in 1637, Major General in 1643, Privy Councilor in 1652, Field Marshal in 1656, under the terms of the Treaty of Roskilde in 1658 became Governor General of Scania, Halland and Blekinge, Lord High Admiral in 1664, and Chancellor of Lund University in 1666. He was deposed as admiral by King Charles XI of Sweden in 1675.

Family 
22 July 1645 married 1stly Baroness Brita Horn of Åminne (died 1685). 
Children
Count Gustaf Stenbock (1646–1672)
Beata Stenbock (died 1648)
Sigrid Stenbock (died 1648)
Christina Katharina Stenbock (1649–1719), married Swedish statesman and Governor-General of Estonia Anders Torstenson.
Magdalena Katharina Stenbock (1652–1676), married Gustaf Mauritz Lewenhaupt (1651–1700), son of Gustaf Adolf Lewenhaupt
Count Carl Otto Stenbock (1653–1697), married baroness Margareta Soop of Limingo 

1 June 1658 married 2ndly Gothenburg countess Christina Catharine De la Gardie (1632–1704), daughter of Field Marshal and Count Jakob De la Gardie (1583–1652) and Countess Ebba Brahe (1596–1674) in Gothenburg and bought one of the largest estate in the Baltic area (Kolga manor, Kuusalu Parish) in Estonia from De la Gardie family with a land of 500 km². 
Children
Brigitta Stenbock (1660–1682)
Beata Margareta Stenbock (1661–1735), married count Gustaf Douglas (1648–1705)
Count Erik Gustaf Stenbock (1662–1722), married Countess Johanna Eleonora De la Gardie (1661–1708)
Count Jakob Stenbock
Count Magnus Stenbock (1663–1717), Swedish military officer, married Eva Magdalena Oxenstierna
Hedvig Eleonora Stenbock (1664–1729), 1684 married Freiherr Lorentz Creutz d.y.(1646–1698).
Charlotta Maria Stenbock (1667–1740), married count Axel Johan Lewenhaupt (1660–1717).

External links

Worldroots.com - The Descendants of Gustaf I Eriksson, King of Sweden
Gustaf Otto Stenbock (Gustavsson) Swedish
Stenbock family tree at Ancestry.com community 
Gustaf Otto Stenbock family
 Portrait, 1729: Gustavus Otto Stenbock

1614 births
1685 deaths
People from Tranemo Municipality
Field marshals of Sweden
Governors-General of Sweden
Swedish nobility
Members of the Privy Council of Sweden
Swedish admirals
17th-century Swedish military personnel
17th-century Swedish politicians